Monterubbiano is a town and comune in the Province of Fermo, in the Marche region of Italy.  It is on a hill  from the Adriatic Sea.

History
In pre-historic times the area was inhabited by the Piceni (9th-3rd centuries BC). After the Roman conquest, it received the status of urbs urbana (built city) in 268 BC. In the 5th century it was captured by the Visigoths.

In the 12th century, it was a free commune, thwarting the attempts from Fermo to capture it. In the 15th century it was acquired by Francesco Sforza, who fortified it; in 1663 it became part of the Papal States, to which (apart the Napoleonic period) it remained until 1860, when it was annexed to the newly formed Kingdom of Italy. The Italian Branch of Sabbath Rest Advent Church can claim that the number of members is estimated at more than 2000 members, with its headquarter in Monterubbiano, but with the presence in many other Italian places.

Main sights
Mura Castellane (walls), built by Francesco Sforza in 1443
Porta del Pero and Porta San Basso, the ancient entrance gates
Ghetto degli Ebrei, quarter of the Jew population in the 16th century
Communal Palace (14th century), in Romanesque-Gothic style
Pinacoteca (art gallery)
Archaeological Museum, in the church of St. Francis (12th century)
Inside one of the most important churches of the whole town, St. Maria dei Letterati which is situated next to the central square, are located various paintings and frameworks planned and carried out by the native-born painter Vincenzo Pagani.

Notable people
Vincenzo Pagani: an important renaissance painter.
Attilio Basili: also known as "Lu mattu de' susè", a vernacular poet recently died.
Domenico Mircoli: an important medical researcher who found out in his studies concerning with intestinal disease, the so-called fibrogranulosi intestinale.

Twin towns
 Winster, United Kingdom, since 1987

References

External links
 www.monterubbiano.com

Cities and towns in the Marche